Shaun Cameron Wright-Phillips (born 25 October 1981) is an English former professional footballer who played as a winger. He played in the Premier League and Football League for Manchester City, Chelsea and Queens Park Rangers, in Major League Soccer for the New York Red Bulls, in the United Soccer League for the New York Red Bulls II and Phoenix Rising FC, and at senior international level for the England national team.

A Nottingham Forest youth product, he spent 13 seasons playing in the Premier League during spells with Manchester City, Chelsea and Queens Park Rangers. In 2015, he joined Major League Soccer club New York Red Bulls alongside his brother, Bradley. Wright-Phillips joined Phoenix Rising FC in 2017.

The England international scored six goals in 36 appearances for the national team, which included selection for the 2010 FIFA World Cup.

Early life
Shaun Cameron Wright-Phillips was born on 25 October 1981 in Greenwich, Greater London. He is the son of former England international Ian Wright, who adopted him at the age of three. His younger brother, Bradley Wright-Phillips, is also a professional footballer and the all-time top scorer for the New York Red Bulls. Wright-Phillips grew up in Brockley and attended Haberdashers' Aske's Hatcham College in New Cross Gate. Wright-Phillips is of Trinidadian and Grenadian descent.

Club career

Manchester City
Wright-Phillips was released by Nottingham Forest aged 17 and Manchester City took him to Maine Road. He made his first-team debut as a substitute in the second leg of a League Cup match against Burnley, replacing Terry Cooke. His league debut came two months later at Port Vale. Brought on as substitute striker, he helped his team turn a 1–0 deficit into a 2–1 win. His shot resulted in the first Manchester City goal, which Wright-Phillips attempted to claim, though the strike was later credited as an own goal instead. He then started the next two matches in place of Paul Dickov, who was absent through injury. Once Dickov recovered, Wright-Phillips returned to the reserves, making only one further first team appearance that season. City finished second in the First Division, resulting in promotion to the Premier League for the 2000–01 season.

Wright-Phillips featured more regularly than the previous season but was still not fully established in the first team, making 12 starts and seven substitute appearances playing in a variety of attacking positions. Manchester City's stay in the Premier League was brief; at the end of the season they were relegated.

Under Keegan, Wright-Phillips firmly established himself in the first team, not as a forward, but as a wing-back. Keegan was known for playing attacking football, and decided to use the attacking Wright-Phillips in a traditionally defensive position due to his mobility and dribbling ability. From 2000 to 2003, Wright-Phillips won Manchester City's Young Player of the Year award four times in succession, surpassing Steve Kinsey's record of three times.

On 17 November 2004, he became one of the main targets of racist chants from sections of the Spanish crowd at an international friendly between England and Spain in Madrid. However, he brushed that aside with his performance in his next Manchester City appearance at Portsmouth, saying to reporters after the match, "I just let the football do the talking". He also has a similar response regarding his father, saying in an interview with manchesteronline.co.uk: "The press brought up my adopted father's name. They relate to his name and that is fine by me – it comes with the name, but I will be my own man. I have made my own path and started to take my own steps.". His son is also going through City's youth ranks at the moment.

Chelsea

On 18 July 2005, Wright-Phillips completed a £21 million move to Premier League champions Chelsea, returning to his native London. He joined the club on a five-year contract after agreeing to personal terms and passing a medical. He had previously said he would not leave Manchester City. His appearances were initially limited, starting only 15 times for Chelsea in 2005–06 and struggling to find scoring form. An inconsistent first season with Chelsea culminated in him missing out on the opportunity to travel to Germany with the England squad for the 2006 FIFA World Cup.

Despite making few first-team appearances, Wright-Phillips maintained that he was happy at Chelsea and wanted to stay and fight for a first-team place. He received a boost from his manager José Mourinho, when the latter declined to make an approach for Real Betis winger Joaquín, stating that he had enough options in terms of wingers. His first goal for the club came in a 2–0 Champions League win over Levski Sofia on 5 December 2006, in his 52nd match and almost 17 months after his transfer.

As 2006–07 progressed, Wright-Phillips picked up form and scored his first league goal against West Ham United on 18 April, following it up with his second in the same match. Subsequently, he started in several matches towards the end of the season including the 2007 FA Cup Final which Chelsea won.

At the beginning of 2007–08, Wright-Phillips maintained his starting place on the right wing. He also maintained his place after José Mourinho left Chelsea and under new coach Avram Grant. He was selected to play in the 2008 League Cup Final, which Chelsea lost to Tottenham Hotspur. He only made another six appearances that season and failed to make the match day squad for the 2008 UEFA Champions League Final. Having made 65 starting appearances for the club, with a further 60 as a substitute, Wright-Phillips had been unable to secure a regular place in the team under Grant and Mourinho. After falling out of favour with new manager Luiz Felipe Scolari, he was allowed to leave the club.

Return to Manchester City

On 28 August 2008, he re-joined former club Manchester City on a four-year contract for an undisclosed fee, believed to be in the region of £8.5 million. On his second debut, Wright-Phillips scored two goals against Sunderland in the 3–0 away win in the Premier League. His third goal for City came in a 6–0 victory over Portsmouth on 21 September 2008. Wright-Phillips equalled his entire goalscoring record at Chelsea just over a month after returning to City. His right footed drive in the second half against Omonia Nicosia on 2 October helped steer City through to the group stages of the UEFA Cup for the first time. On 29 October, Wright-Phillips swore at former Middlesbrough manager Gareth Southgate during Manchester City's 2–0 defeat to his club, after Southgate complained about Wright-Phillips appearing to go down too easily after a challenge. The Football Association warned Wright-Phillips about his future conduct.

The 2009–10 season started very well for Wright-Phillips, setting up Emmanuel Adebayor's first goal for Man City in the third minute of a 2–0 win against Blackburn Rovers.  He followed that up with a goal in a League Cup tie with Crystal Palace. Three weeks later against Arsenal, he set up a goal for Adebayor before scoring one for himself. He went on to score in successive home matches against Burnley and Hull City where he delivered an assist for Carlos Tevez's debut Man City goal. During his next game against Arsenal he scored in a 3–0 League Cup win which saw City progress to the tournament's semi finals. He found himself in-and-out of the team under manager Roberto Mancini, with new signing Adam Johnson's form forcing Wright-Phillips to be a substitute in most matches, including City's match at his former club Chelsea at Stamford Bridge. He came off the bench to replace Johnson in the 60th minute and then set up Craig Bellamy's second goal in the 4–2 win. Despite his impact in the match, Wright-Phillips had not secured a place in the team. He started for City on the final match of the 2009–10 Premier League against West Ham at Upton Park, where he scored the equaliser in a 1–1 draw.

The 2010–11 season saw Wright-Phillips only make seven league appearances, with the increased competition for places following the signings of David Silva and Yaya Touré resulting in him rarely being included in the club's matchday squad. City won the 2010–11 FA Cup, and despite being left out of the squad for the final, he did contribute some appearances earlier in the cup run, including coming on as a substitute against Manchester United in the semi-final.

Queens Park Rangers
On 31 August 2011, the final day of the transfer window, Wright-Phillips signed for Queens Park Rangers (QPR) on a three-year contract for an undisclosed fee. He made his full debut for QPR against Newcastle United on 12 September 2011, making the starting line-up and winning man of the match by supporters. He failed to score a goal for almost a year before scoring his first the following season for QPR against Walsall in the League Cup on 28 August 2012. His only goal for QPR in the Premier League came during the derby against former club Chelsea on 2 January 2013, which ended 1–0. Despite this, QPR would find themselves relegated to the Championship at the end of the season. QPR would return to the Premiership at the first time of asking, defeating Derby County in the play-off finals, though Wright-Phillips would increasingly find his role throughout the season diminished to the occasional cameo from the subs bench and reserve outings. After featuring even more sporadically during 2014–15, QPR announced that Wright-Phillips would be released from his contract in a batch of players that included fellow former England internationals Rio Ferdinand and Joey Barton.

New York Red Bulls
In June 2015, Wright-Phillips began training with Major League Soccer club the New York Red Bulls to regain fitness following his departure from QPR. Impressing head coach Jesse Marsch, he suggested he would sign for the club when his contract officially expired on 30 June.

On 27 July, he completed a move to join his brother, Bradley Wright-Phillips, at the New York Red Bulls. He made his debut on 1 August, coming off the bench to win a penalty and assist his brother in a 3–1 victory at the Philadelphia Union. Wright-Phillips was named in the MLS Team of the Week following the performance.

Wright-Phillips was released by the Red Bulls at the end of the 2015 Major League Soccer season, but was later re-signed on 25 January 2016.

Phoenix Rising FC
On 23 February 2017, Wright-Phillips signed for United Soccer League club Phoenix Rising FC. He made his debut on 26 March 2017, in a 1–0 defeat to Toronto FC II.

Wright-Phillips announced his retirement from playing on 24 August 2019 at the age of 37.

International career
Wright-Phillips made his England debut as a substitute for Nicky Butt against Ukraine on 18 August 2004. He scored the last of England's goals in a 3–0 win, described by BBC Sport as "crowning a solo run with a stunning finish." He was a regular member of England's squad during qualification for the 2006 FIFA World Cup and made his first competitive start in a 1–0 away win over Wales. After a decline in form, however, especially a poor performance away to Northern Ireland, and a lack of matches following his move to Chelsea, he missed out on a place in the squad for the World Cup finals.

After a good start to the 2007–08 season, Wright-Phillips received an England recall to play against Germany in a friendly match at the new Wembley Stadium. Wright-Phillips was brought on as a substitute in the second half during the match in which England lost 2–1 to Germany and he was named the England sponsor's man of the match after an impressive performance.

On 8 September 2007, Wright-Phillips was selected to start against Israel in a UEFA Euro 2008 qualifier he scored the first goal in the 3–0 victory and won the England sponsor's man of the match award with his performance. He was then selected to start for England against Estonia and scored his third goal for England and the opener in a third consecutive 3–0 win at Wembley. He was selected in England's critical Euro 2008 qualifying match against Croatia, substituted at half time in favour of David Beckham with England trailing 2–0, with England eventually losing 3–2 and therefore missing out on Euro 2008.

On 14 October 2009, with England having already qualified for the 2010 World Cup, Wright-Phillips was selected in the starting XI against Belarus at Wembley Stadium." Unusually, he was joined in the team (which was missing Wayne Rooney through injury) by Tottenham Hotspur's Aaron Lennon, meaning England played with two recognised wingers. Mid-way through the second half, Wright-Phillips drove in a shot from the edge of the penalty area which beat the dive of the Belarus goalkeeper. He appeared as a second-half substitute against Egypt on 3 March 2010, scoring England's second goal and assisting Peter Crouch for the third as they came from behind to win 3–1.

On 1 June 2010, Wright-Phillips was selected for England's final 23-man squad that was to play in the 2010 FIFA World Cup in South Africa. He appeared as a substitute in England's opening two group matches against United States and Algeria.

Personal life
Wright-Phillips has a son, D'Margio Wright-Phillips, who plays for Stoke City. He is also capped for England U16s.

Career statistics

Club

International

Scores and results list England's goal tally first, score column indicates score after each Wright-Phillips goal

Honours
Manchester City
Football League First Division: 2001–02
FA Cup: 2010–11

Chelsea
Premier League: 2005–06
FA Cup: 2006–07
FA Community Shield: 2005
Football League Cup runner-up: 2007–08

Individual
Manchester City Young Player of the Year: 1999–2000, 2000–01, 2001–02, 2002–03
Manchester City Player of the Year: 2003–04
PFA Team of the Year: 2004–05 Premier League

References

External links

1981 births
Living people
Footballers from Greenwich
English footballers
Association football wingers
Nottingham Forest F.C. players
Manchester City F.C. players
Chelsea F.C. players
Queens Park Rangers F.C. players
New York Red Bulls players
New York Red Bulls II players
Phoenix Rising FC players
English Football League players
Premier League players
Major League Soccer players
USL Championship players
FA Cup Final players
England under-21 international footballers
England international footballers
2010 FIFA World Cup players
English expatriate footballers
Expatriate soccer players in the United States
English expatriate sportspeople in the United States
Black British sportsmen
English adoptees
English sportspeople of Grenadian descent
English sportspeople of Trinidad and Tobago descent
Shaun